Ricardo María Mendiguren Egaña (born 19 October 1968) is a Spanish retired footballer who played as a forward.

Club career
Born in Oñati, Gipuzkoa, Mendiguren emerged through Athletic Bilbao's youth ranks. Still a junior, he managed to make his debut for both the reserve team and the main squad, respectively in the Segunda División and La Liga, first appearing for the latter on 8 February 1987 in a 0–0 home draw against Cádiz CF.

Mendiguren's best years were from 1988 to 1990, as he totalled 63 league matches for the Basque side (54 starts) whilst scoring 14 goals, with the team finishing seventh and 12th respectively; in subsequent seasons, he returned to his role as a bench player, but still managed to be used regularly. 

In the 1994–95 UEFA Cup, Mendiguren contributed six appearances as Athletic reached the third round, starting in both legs against Newcastle United (his side advanced on the away goals rule, 3–3 on aggregate). He amassed competitive totals of 223 games and 23 goals during his spell at the San Mamés Stadium.

Mendiguren left Bilbao in the 1997 January transfer window to move to UD Las Palmas of the second division, but retired after having made no appearances for the club from the Canary Islands due to injury.

Career statistics

References

External links

1968 births
Living people
People from Oñati
Sportspeople from Gipuzkoa
Spanish footballers
Footballers from the Basque Country (autonomous community)
Association football forwards
La Liga players
Segunda División players
Bilbao Athletic footballers
Athletic Bilbao footballers
UD Las Palmas players
Spain youth international footballers
Spain under-21 international footballers